The Calgary Caledonian Football Club, better known as the Calgary Callies, is a Canadian soccer club which currently plays in the Alberta Major Soccer League.

History

This club was founded on April 26, 1904. Over the years they have become a dominant club in Alberta and Canadian soccer.

In 2007, the Canadian Soccer Hall of Fame inducted the Calgary Caledonians from 1907 as a team of distinction. Calgary Caledonians were unofficial champions of Canada in 1907, 1908 and 1909 winning the People's Shield in each of those years. They won the championship of Western Canada in 1906 by beating Minnedosa 2–0 in Manitoba. The Callies great run in the People's Shield began in 1907, a year in which they dominated the Calgary League, winning 14 of the 16 games played with two being drawn. The People's Shield finals were played in Winnipeg, where the Callies beat Toronto Thistles in the semi-final and Winnipeg Brittania 1–0 in the final. The team won the championship of Alberta six times between 1908 and 1923.

The Calgary Callies played at the Canadian National Challenge Cup in 1999 and 2000 as the Calgary Celtic SFC.

In April 2008 the Callies sent senior players Chris Kooy and André Duberry to Livingston F.C. and youth player Charlie Beaulieu to Kilmarnock FC for a 2-week trial.

Year-by-year

Honours
Canadian National Challenge Cup
Champions (4): 1907(People's Shield), 1908(People's Shield), 1909(People's Shield), (Calgary Celtic) 1999, 2003, 2007, 2008
Runners-up (2): 2006, 2014
4th Place: 2009
9th Place: 2004
Alberta Senior Provincial Championship
Champions (10): 1999, 2000, 2002, 2003, 2004, 2006, 2007, 2008, 2009, 2014
Runners Up (1): 2011
5th Place: 2005

References

External links
Official website

Soccer clubs in Calgary
Association football clubs established in 1904
Soccer